Ulrik le Fevre (born 25 June 1946) is a Danish former professional football player and manager, and current FIFA-licensed player agent. He was a left winger, who had a fierce shot. He played for Danish club Vejle Boldklub, German club Borussia Mönchengladbach and Club Brugge in Belgium, and won the national championship with all three clubs. He played 37 matches and scored seven goals for the Denmark national team.

Biography
Born in Vejle, le Fevre started playing for local top-flight club Vejle Boldklub. He made his senior debut in April 1965, and was called up for the Denmark under-21 national team in June 1965. He made his Danish national team later that year, in December. After four years at Vejle, he moved abroad to play professionally in the middle of 1969.

He signed for German club Borussia Mönchengladbach. Due to the Danish rules of amateurism, le Fevre's national team career went on hiatus in June 1969, after 28 national games. When the Danish rule of amateurism was abolished in 1971, le Fevre returned to the Danish national team in June 1971. With Mönchengladbach, he won the 1970 and 1971 Bundesliga championships. His most notable goal was scored in the 1971–72 Bundesliga season. In a November 1971 game against Schalke 04, he juggled the ball twice in the opposition penalty area before volleying the ball into the net. The goal was awarded the 1971 "Tor des Jahres".

In 1972, Mönchengladbach bought Danish striker Henning Jensen, and le Fevre moved on to play for Club Brugge in Belgium. At Club Brugge, he won three Belgian Jupiler League championships, in 1973, 1976 and 1977, as well as the 1977 Belgian Cup. He moved back to Denmark in July 1977, and ended his career back with childhood club Vejle Boldklub. He won the 1978 Danish championship, making him the first Danish player to win the championship in three countries. He retired in November 1978, having played a total 156 games and scored 31 goals for Vejle Boldklub.

Honours
Borussia Mönchengladbach
Bundesliga: 1969–70, 1970–71

Club Brugge

Belgian First Division: 1972–73, 1975–76, 1976–77
Belgian Cup: 1976–77
UEFA Cup: runner-up 1975–76
Jules Pappaert Cup: 1972

Vejle BK
Danish championship: 1978

Individual

 German Goal of the Year award: 1971

References

External links
 
 Club Brugge profile 
 

1946 births
Living people
Danish men's footballers
Association football wingers
Denmark international footballers
Borussia Mönchengladbach players
Vejle Boldklub players
Club Brugge KV players
Bundesliga players
Belgian Pro League players
Danish expatriate men's footballers
Danish expatriate sportspeople in Belgium
Expatriate footballers in Belgium
Danish expatriate sportspeople in West Germany
Expatriate footballers in West Germany
People from Vejle Municipality
Sportspeople from the Region of Southern Denmark